The Man Who Spoke Snakish  is a novel by Estonian author Andrus Kivirähk. It was first published in 2007. In 2008 an audiobook was published, read by the Estonian actor Tiit Sukk. The novel was awarded the Stalker award of Estonian science fiction in 2008.

The novel has been translated into English (2015), as well as Czech (2011), Latvian (2011), French (as L'Homme qui savait la langue des serpents, 2013), Russian (2014), Danish (2015), Dutch (2015), Hungarian (2015), Spanish (2017), German (2017), Macedonian (2019) and Lithuanian (2020). In 2009 a board game with the same name was released by the game developer Revaler in cooperation with the newspaper Eesti Päevaleht.
It is set in an imaginary Estonia during the Middle Ages.

The French translation was awarded the Grand Prix de l'Imaginaire for the best foreign-language novel in 2014.

The protagonist is Leemet, an Estonian who is part of a diminishing group of forest-dwellers, upholding ancient traditions and speaking the ancient "snake-tongue" which lets them control animals and speak with snakes.

References 

Estonian novels
2007 novels